Alafouzos is a surname. The female form of the surname is Alafouzou.  Notable people with the surname include:

Aristeidis Alafouzos (1924 –2017), Greek businessman Greek and civil engineer
Giannis Alafouzos (born 1957), Greek businessman, son of above

Greek-language surnames